"Stonehaven", also known as the John and Sarah Lundgren House, is a historic home located at Chester Heights, Delaware County, Pennsylvania. The original section was built in 1799, and is a -story, five-bay by two-bay stone building.  It is a vernacular Federal-era dwelling with a Georgian plan.  A two-bay, stone kitchen addition was built in 1811, and a wood-frame addition was added to that after 1910.

It was added to the National Register of Historic Places in 1996.

References

Houses on the National Register of Historic Places in Pennsylvania
Georgian architecture in Pennsylvania
Houses completed in 1799
Houses in Delaware County, Pennsylvania
National Register of Historic Places in Delaware County, Pennsylvania